The Argyle e.p.. is the third EP released by the New Jersey punk band The Bouncing Souls.  It was released on Chunksaah Records in 1993. All of the songs on this EP were later released on The Good, The Bad & The Argyle.

Track listing

Side A
"Old School"

Side B
"These Are The Quotes From Our Favorite 80s Movies"
"Joe Lies (When He Cries...)"

The Bouncing Souls EPs
1993 EPs
Chunksaah Records EPs